The Portulacaceae are a family of flowering plants, comprising 115 species in a single genus Portulaca. Formerly some 20 genera with about 500 species, were placed there, but it is now restricted to encompass only one genus, the other genera being placed elsewhere. The family has been recognised by most taxonomists, and is also known as the purslane family. It has a cosmopolitan distribution, with the highest diversity in semiarid regions of the Southern Hemisphere in Africa, Australia, and South America, but with a few species also extending north into Arctic regions. The family is very similar to the Caryophyllaceae, differing in the calyx, which has only two sepals.

The APG II system (2003; unchanged from the APG system of 1998) assigns it to the order Caryophyllales in the clade core eudicots. In the APG III system, several genera were moved to the Montiaceae, Didiereaceae, Anacampserotaceae and Talinaceae, thus making the family monotypic and only containing the genus Portulaca.

Species
The following species are accepted:

Portulaca africana (Danin & H.G.Baker) Danin
Portulaca almeviae Ocampo
Portulaca amilis Speg. – Paraguayan purslane
Portulaca anceps A.Rich.
Portulaca argentinensis Speg.
Portulaca aurantiaca Proctor
Portulaca australis Endl.
Portulaca badamica S.R.Yadav & Dalavi
Portulaca bicolor F.Muell. – Australian pigweed
Portulaca biloba Urb. – Cuban purslane
Portulaca brevifolia Urb.
Portulaca bulbifera M.G.Gilbert
Portulaca californica D.Legrand
Portulaca canariensis Danin & Reyes-Bet.
Portulaca cardenasiana D.Legrand – Puerto Rican purslane
Portulaca caulerpoides Britton & P.Wilson
Portulaca centrali-africana R.E.Fr.
Portulaca chacoana D.Legrand
Portulaca ciferrii Chiov.
Portulaca clavigera R.Geesink
Portulaca colombiana D.Legrand
Portulaca commutata M.G.Gilbert
Portulaca confertifolia Hauman
Portulaca conoidea S.M.Phillips
Portulaca constricta M.G.Gilbert
Portulaca conzattii P.Wilson
Portulaca coralloides S.M.Phillips
Portulaca cryptopetala Speg.
Portulaca cubensis Britton & P.Wilson
Portulaca cyclophylla F.Muell.
Portulaca cypria Danin
Portulaca daninii Galasso, Banfi & Soldano
Portulaca decipiens Poelln.
Portulaca decorticans M.G.Gilbert
Portulaca dhofarica M.G.Gilbert
Portulaca diegoi Mattos
Portulaca digyna F.Muell.
Portulaca dodomaensis M.G.Gilbert
Portulaca echinosperma Hauman
Portulaca edulis Danin & Bagella
Portulaca elatior Mart. ex Rohrb.
Portulaca elongata Rusby
Portulaca eruca Hauman
Portulaca erythraeae Schweinf.
Portulaca fascicularis Peter
Portulaca filifolia F.Muell.
Portulaca filsonii J.H.Willis
Portulaca fischeri Pax
Portulaca fluvialis D.Legrand
Portulaca foliosa Ker Gawl.
Portulaca fragilis Poelln.
Portulaca frieseana Poelln.
Portulaca fulgens Griseb.
Portulaca gilliesii Hook.
Portulaca giuliettiae T.Vieira & A.A.Coelho
Portulaca goiasensis T.Vieira & A.A.Coelho
Portulaca gracilis Poelln.
Portulaca grandiflora Hook. – moss-rose purslane
Portulaca grandis Peter
Portulaca granulatostellulata (Poelln.) Ricceri & Arrigoni
Portulaca greenwayi M.G.Gilbert
Portulaca guanajuatensis Ocampo
Portulaca halimoides L. – silkcotton purslane
Portulaca hatschbachii D.Legrand
Portulaca hereroensis Schinz
Portulaca heterophylla Peter
Portulaca hirsutissima Cambess.
Portulaca hoehnei D.Legrand
Portulaca howellii (D.Legrand) Eliasson
Portulaca humilis Peter
Portulaca impolita (Danin & H.G.Baker) Danin
Portulaca insignis Steyerm.
Portulaca intraterranea J.M.Black
Portulaca johnstonii Henrickson
Portulaca juliomartinezii Ocampo
Portulaca kermesina N.E.Br.
Portulaca kuriensis M.G.Gilbert
Portulaca lakshminarasimhaniana S.R.Yadav & Dalavi
Portulaca lutea Sol. ex G.Forst. – yellow purslane
Portulaca macbridei D.Legrand
Portulaca macrantha Ricceri & Arrigoni
Portulaca macrorhiza R.Geesink
Portulaca macrosperma D.Legrand
Portulaca masonii D.Legrand
Portulaca massaica S.M.Phillips
Portulaca matthewsii Ocampo
Portulaca mauritiensis Poelln.
Portulaca mexicana P.Wilson
Portulaca meyeri D.Legrand
Portulaca minensis D.Legrand
Portulaca minuta Correll
Portulaca molokiniensis Hobdy – Ihi
Portulaca monanthoides Lodé
Portulaca mucronata Link
Portulaca mucronulata D.Legrand
Portulaca nicaraguensis (Danin & H.G.Baker) Danin
Portulaca nitida (Danin & H.G.Baker) Ricceri & Arrigoni
Portulaca nivea Poelln.
Portulaca nogalensis Chiov.
Portulaca oblonga Peter
Portulaca obtusa Poelln.
Portulaca obtusifolia D.Legrand
Portulaca okinawensis E.Walker & Tawada
Portulaca oleracea L. – common purslane, pigweed
Portulaca oligosperma F.Muell.
Portulaca olosirwa S.M.Phillips
Portulaca papillatostellulata (Danin & H.G.Baker) Danin
Portulaca papulifera D.Legrand
Portulaca papulosa Schltdl.
Portulaca paucistaminata Poelln.
Portulaca perennis R.E.Fr.
Portulaca peteri Poelln.
Portulaca philippii I.M.Johnst.
Portulaca pilosa L. – shaggy purslane
Portulaca psammotropha Hance
Portulaca pusilla Kunth
Portulaca pygmaea Steyerm.
Portulaca quadrifida L. – chickenweed purslane
Portulaca ragonesei D.Legrand
Portulaca ramosa Peter
Portulaca rausii Danin
Portulaca rhodesiana R.A.Dyer & E.A.Bruce
Portulaca rotundifolia R.E.Fr.
Portulaca rubricaulis Kunth – redstem purslane
Portulaca rzedowskiana Ocampo
Portulaca samhaensis A.G.Mill.
Portulaca samoensis Poelln.
Portulaca sanctae-martae Poelln.
Portulaca sardoa Danin, Bagella & Marrosu
Portulaca saxifragoides Welw. ex Oliv.
Portulaca sclerocarpa A.Gray – Ihi makole
Portulaca sedifolia N.E.Br.
Portulaca sedoides Welw. ex Oliv.
Portulaca sicula Danin, Domina & Raimondo
Portulaca smallii P.Wilson – Small's purslane
Portulaca socotrana Domina & Raimondo
Portulaca somalica N.E.Br.
Portulaca stellulatotuberculata Poelln.
Portulaca stuhlmannii Poelln.
Portulaca suffrutescens Engelm. – shrubby purslane
Portulaca suffruticosa Wight
Portulaca sundaensis Poelln.
Portulaca thellusonii Lindl.
Portulaca tingoensis J.F.Macbr.
Portulaca trianthemoides Bremek.
Portulaca trituberculata Danin, Domina & Raimondo
Portulaca tuberculata León
Portulaca tuberosa Roxb.
Portulaca umbraticola Kunth – wingpod purslane
Portulaca werdermannii Poelln.
Portulaca wightiana Wall. ex Wight & Arn.
Portulaca yecorensis Henrickson & T.Van Devender
Portulaca zaffranii Danin

Formerly placed here
Anacampseros arachnoides (Haw.) Sims (as P. arachnoides Haw.)
Anacampseros filamentosa subsp. filamentosa (as P. filamentosa Haw.)
Anacampseros lanceolata subsp. lanceolata (as P. lanceolata Haw.)
Anacampseros rufescens (Haw.) Sweet (as P. rufescens Haw.)
Anacampseros telephiastrum DC. (as P. anacampseros L.)
Sesuvium portulacastrum (L.) L. (as P. portulacastrum L.)
Talinum fruticosum (L.) Juss. (as P. fruticosa L. or P. triangularis Jacq.)
Talinum paniculatum (Jacq.) Gaertn. (as P. paniculata Jacq. or P. patens L.)

Uses
Common purslane (Portulaca oleracea) is widely consumed as an edible plant, and in some areas it is invasive. Portulaca grandiflora is a well-known ornamental garden plant. Purslanes are relished by chickens. Some Portulaca species are used as food plants by the larvae of some Lepidoptera species including the nutmeg moth (Hadula trifolii).

Gallery

References

 
 
 Portulacaceae in L. Watson and M.J. Dallwitz (1992 onwards). The families of flowering plants
 Flora of North America: Portulacaceae
 Flora of China: Portulacaceae
 links at CSDL
 Portulacaceae of Chile, by Chileflora

 
Caryophyllales genera
 
Monogeneric plant families
Caryophyllales families